is a Japanese Shinto divination ritual.

Function and performance
Hayashi Oen, a nineteenth-century practitioner of ukehi, identified six functions of the rite. He claimed it could be used to:
 ask for information or messages from the kami
 establish the will of the kami
 predict the outcome of an event
 enervate or animate living beings
 manipulate weather conditions
 kill one's enemies

The dictates of ukehi can come as a dream, but more commonly the petitioner would use the ritual to ask a question of the kami and then await an omen of some sort to confirm their  response. If nothing happened, it was assumed that the kami did not favour the proposed course of action. The questioning of the kami took the form of an oath or vow. Sometimes the ritual involved inscribing the choices available on bamboo slips, which were then shaken in a container; whichever slip fell out dictated the appropriate course of action.

Notable ukehi
 An ukehi ritual undertaken by the deities Amaterasu and Susanoo-no-Mikoto resulted in the birth of eight more deities.
 In the late 19th century, Hayashi Oen and his pupil Otaguro Tomoo performed ukehi several times, and eventually the latter received what he believed was divine authorization to begin the Shinpūren rebellion.

See also
 Kotodama
 Daigensuihō

References

Shinto
Divination